Hoyerswerda or Wojerecy is a major district town in the district of Bautzen in the German state of Saxony. It is located in the Sorbian settlement area of Upper Lusatia, a region where some people speak the Sorbian language in addition to German.

Hoyerswerda is divided into the Old Town and the New Town, surrounded by village areas. The Old Town is the historical centre with many old houses and sight-seeing attractions, the New Town is more modern and varicoloured. Prior to the renovation of the town, prefabricated apartment blocks predominated in this area.

The town has many lakes, marshes and waterways in its surrounding area, because of its situation in Lusatia. This brings many tourists to spend their holidays there. It is attractive for cyclists and inline skaters who use recently created paths meandering among the lakes.

Geography
The town is situated in the north of the District of Bautzen, close to the borders of Saxony with Brandenburg. Major cities and towns in proximity are Cottbus  in the north-west, Dresden  in the south-west and Berlin  in the north. Hoyerswerda is part of Upper Lusatia and lies on a rural plain characterised by the presence of several lakes and some marshes.

Districts
Hoyerswerda is divided beside the Old Town and New Town into the following districts (names given in German/Upper Sorbian):

 Bröthen-Michalken (German), Brětnja/Michałki (Upper Sorbian)
 Dörgenhausen/Němcy
 Knappenrode/Hórnikecy
 Schwarzkollm/Čorny Chołmc
 Zeißig/Ćisk

Old Town
The old town of Hoyerswerda is divided into eleven districts:

Neida, Dresdner Vorstadt, Am Bahnhof ('At the Railway Station'), Am Stadtrand ('On the Outskirts'), an der Neupetershainer Bahn, An der Thrune, Innere Altstadt ('Inner Historic Centre'), Senftenberger Vorstadt, Spremberger Vorstadt, Nördliche Elsteraue, Südliche Elsteraue.

New Town
The new town of Hoyerswerda is divided into 14 districts:

Neustadt Zentrum ('New Town Centre'), Kühnicht, Grünewaldring, Gondelteich ('Gondola Lake'), Wohnkomplex I, Wohnkomplex II, Wohnkomplex III, Wohnkomplex IV, Wohnkomplex V/VE, Wohnkomplex VI, Wohnkomplex VII, Wohnkomplex VIII, Wohnkomplex IX, Wohnkomplex X.

Sources:

History

Early history
The first settlers arrived in this area in 700 AD. They were Milceni Slavs. Many artifacts from this old culture have been found in the Hoyerswerda area.

In 1150, Hoyerswerda first appeared on a map of Lusatia.

The city was first mentioned in 1268. At the time the mayor was Hoyer von Vredeberg.

In 1371 it was designated an official market town. Before this Hoyerswerda was a very little town with few structures, but the city then grew under the leadership of the new mayor Karl IV.

It received municipal rights from Freiherr von Duba on 19 December 1423, as well as the right to elect its own council.

In the 17th century, the city experienced many problems due to the 30 Years War. The Number of inhabitants dropped drastically, but recovered by the end of the century.

In 1624, Hoyerswerda became the capital of the Spremberg district. A few years later the district took the name Hoyerswerda because of the growing importance of the city.

In the middle of this century Hoyerswerda had become the largest town in the Lusatian region.

In the 18th century the Polish King and Elector of Saxony, Augustus II the Strong, gave the Duchy of Hoyerswerda to Ursula Katharina Lubomirska, who helped the town develop trade and manufacturing. In 1737, King Augustus III of Poland bought the town from Lubomirska. The King used to stop in the Hoyerswerda Castle during his travels from Dresden to Warsaw. The Battle of Hoyerswerda occurred nearby in 1759 during the Seven Years' War.

In 1815 Hoyerswerda became part of the Kingdom of Prussia. In 1871, with Prussia, it became part of the German Empire. In 1873 a new railway between Hoyerswerda and Ruhland opened. It had a positive effect on the economic development of the city. In 1912, the Domowina, the organisation of the Sorbs, was founded in the city. In 1918, the Sorbs protested here against the policy of Germanisation. The town became part of the Prussian Province of Lower Silesia in 1919.

Recent history

At the end of the Second World War the town was declared a core centre of German defence and was therefore heavily damaged. The invading Soviet Red Army set the town on fire. It became part of Saxony again after the war, but from 1952, it was administered by the Bezirk (Region) of Cottbus, until 1990, when the states of East Germany were abolished.

During the GDR period, Hoyerswerda became an important industrial town. The lignite processing enterprise "Schwarze Pumpe" was established in 1955 (it is today in the federal state of Brandenburg). From 1957, the demand for new living space rose dramatically. In the following years, 10 new living areas were established with tens of thousands of apartments being built. In 1981, the city reached its maximum number of inhabitants, with 71,054 residents. At that time, more children per inhabitant were born in Hoyerswerda than anywhere else in the GDR. Upon reunification in 1990, the people of the city decided to become part of the reconstituted state of Saxony. With the end of the GDR and the reorganisation of the East German economy, many enterprises in the industrial region of Hoyerswerda were scaled down or closed.

In 1991 multiple xenophobic attacks targeted immigrant workers from the Far East as well as asylum seekers from Asia, Africa and Eastern Europe. A hostel accommodating asylum seekers was attacked and petrol bombs were thrown. Media coverage of the unrest shocked many in Germany and abroad, provoking much public debate.

Between 1993 and 1998, several smaller villages became part of the city, but the number of overall inhabitants declined rapidly, from about 70,000 people in the 1980s to about 35,000 people by the end of 2012. There have been attempts to renovate the city. Many of the apartment blocks built during the time of the GDR have been demolished or renovated. This project, like others, was financed with money from the EU and the Federal Republic of Germany.

Its role as an independently ruled town ("Kreisfreie Stadt") in Saxony disappeared in 2008 with the reshaping of the regional administration of Saxony.

Sights
Main sights include:
the Hoyerswerda castle
the Market Square (Markt) in the Old Town, including:
the Old Town Hall (Altes Rathaus)
an 18th-century Polish-Saxon post milestone with coats of arms of the Polish–Lithuanian Commonwealth and the Electorate of Saxony and the monogram of King Augustus II the Strong
the Sorbian Fountain (Sorbenbrunnen) from 1980
the St. John's Church (Johanneskirche)
the former seat of the Domowina, built in 1885
the New Town Hall (Neues Rathaus), built in 1904
Planetarium Hoyerswerda, founded in the 1960s
the Lusatian Square (Lausitzer Platz) in the New Town with the Lusatian Hall (Lausitzhalle/Łužiska Hala)
the ZCOM Zuse-Computer-Museum

Seats in the Local council (Stadtrat)

Elections in 2014:
CDU: 10 seats
The Left: 8 seats
Free voters: 5 seats
SPD: 4 seats
AH: 2 seats 
NPD: 1 seat
Total: 30 seats

Economic situation
While part of East Germany, employment in Hoyerswerda was provided by a power plant, glassworks, coal mines, and an army artillery range. With the reunification of Germany and the subsequent demise of a centrally planned economy, the city lost many jobs as the glassworks and artillery range were closed, and the power plant reduced its payroll. The industries on the secondary sector disappeared nearly completely. It is, however, expected that new houses must be built in Hoyerswerda, because of an anticipated increase in population due to copper mining at Schwarze Pumpe. There is also a thermal power plant planned for Hoyerswerda, because the district heating contract with Schwarze Pumpe will end in 2016.

Unemployment remains at 13%. Hoyerswerda holds third place regarding poverty of children according to a statistics of the Child Protection Alliance.

Notable people
 Alfred Otto Herz (1856–1906), entomologist
 Rudolf von Sebottendorf (1875–1945), founder of the anti-semitic and racial Thule Society
 Günter Peters (1907–1987), painter und zoo director, museum curator from 1952 until 1975
 Hermann Mau (1913–1952), historian, teacher and university lecturer
 Kurt Klinkert (1927–2004), painter
 Gertrud Winzer also Gertraud Winzer (born 1940), politician (CDU), MdL
 Rainer Nachtigall (born 1941), footballer in the GDR
 Heinz Kozur (1942–2013), paleontologist and stratigrapher
 Rolf Babiel (1952–2009), well-known gastronome in New York City
 Petra Pfaff (born 1960), track and field athlete
 Frank Hirche (born 1961), politician (CDU), MdL
 Roland Hennig (born 1967), racing cyclist
 Mike Hauschild (born 1972), politician
 Marcel Rozgonyi (born 1976), footballer
 Krystyna Schreiber (born 1976), journalist
 Matthias Heidrich (born 1977), footballer
 Evelyn Schmidt (born 1983), German Wine Queen, 2007/08.
 Stefanie Karg (born 1986), volleyball player
 Tony Jantschke (born 1990), footballer
 Marvin Stefaniak (born 1995), footballer

Lived in Hoyerswerda
 Ursula Katharina Lubomirska (1680–1743), Polish noblewoman, mistress of King Augustus II the Strong (lived here, was owner of the castle for over 30 years)
 Jan Michał Dąbrowski (1718–1779), colonel of the Polish Army (lived here)
 Jan Henryk Dąbrowski (1755–1818), Polish general, national hero of Poland (grew up here)
 Konrad Zuse (1910–1995), computer pioneer (did his Abitur here)
 Rochus Misch (1917–2013), radio operator, bodyguard of Hitler (did his painter education here)
 Brigitte Reimann (1933–1973), writer (lived here in the 1960s)
 Gerhard Gundermann (1955–1998), songwriter and rock musician (Abitur, life and musical work until 1987, sepulchre on the graveyard of Hoyerswerda )

Twin towns – sister cities

Hoyerswerda is twinned with:
 Dillingen, Germany (1988)
 Huittinen, Finland (1998)
 Środa Wielkopolska, Poland (2006)

See also
 Hoyerswerda riots
 Dubringer Moor

References

External links

 
Hoyerswerda at the ISGV website 

 
Towns in Saxony
Populated places in Bautzen (district)
Socialist planned cities